Neuenrade is a town in North Rhine-Westphalia, Germany, located in the hills of the Sauerland in the Märkischer Kreis.

Geography
The highest elevation in the town area is the Kohlberg with an altitude of 514 m above sea level. The lowest elevation is at Hölmecke with 190 m. The town covers an area of 54.12 km², most of which is forests (29.41 km²) and farm land (18.18 km²).

The municipal territory includes the villages of Affeln, Berentrop, Blintrop and Küntrop.

History
Around 1220 the place was first mentioned in a document, then named Rode. The village consisted of about 12 farms. In 1353 the city was fortified. In 1355 it received the cityrights from count Engelbert III.

By 1890/91 the municipalities Werdohl and Ohle had grown so much that they left the Amt Neuenrade, the local administrative unit. The Amt thereafter was composed of only Neuenrade and Dahle.

The Amt Neuenrade was dissolved, effective on January 1, 1969. The municipality Dahle was incorporated into Altena, while the municipality Küntrop from the Amt Balve was incorporated into the city Neuenrade. In 1975 the city was further enlarged with the municipalities Affeln, Altenaffeln and Blintrop from the Amt Balve.

Coat of arms
The coat of arms is based on the coat of arms of the counts of the Mark, showing a chequered red-white bar on a yellow shield. The oldest version of the coat of arms is known from a wood carving in the city church dated from the 16th century; it showed Saint Mary on top of the coat of arms of the Mark. Later the Mary picture was moved inside the shield. It was officially granted on November 25, 1912.

After the communal reform of 1975 the city changed their coat of arms. In the bottom of the shield the black cross of the bishops of Cologne was added, representing the municipalities of the former Amt Balve which historically belonged to Kurköln. The new coat of arms was granted on March 23, 1979, based on a design by Professor Hußmann.

The Amt Neuenrade also had a coat of arms. It was granted on January 13, 1938, and was designed by Waldemar Mallek based on an idea of Dr. Fritz Thomée. It resembled the coat of arms of the city Neuenrade, the bottom part showed a mill wheel. As a municipality Dahle had no traditional heraldic symbol. The mill wheel was chosen symbolizing the traditional industries at the Nette River.

Population development

The numbers from 1800, 1900 and 1955 are estimates. From 1975 the data come from the Statistical Office in North Rhine-Westphalia.

Mayors
1964-1999: Hans Schmerbeck
1999-2014: Klaus-Peter Sasse
Since the 2014 elections, Antonius Wiesemann (CDU) is the mayor of Neuenrade.

International relations

Since 1978 Neuenrade has a city friendship with the Dutch municipality Dinxperlo. In 1984 it was converted into a town twinning. The partnership was reaffirmed in 2005 by the municipality Aalten, of which Dinxperlo had become part that year. Since 1990 it is also twinned with Klingenthal in Saxony.

Personalities 
Hermann Wilken (1522-1603), humanist and mathematician, he died in Heidelberg
Esther Riecke-Volkmann (born 1969, artist)

References

External links

  

 
Märkischer Kreis